Valley Grande is a city in Dallas County, Alabama, United States, just north of Selma. Incorporated in early 2003, Valley Grande has a mayor-council form of government. The city's population was 4,020 at the time of the 2010 census.

History
Valley Grande encompasses the historic community of Summerfield. Established in 1819 as "Valley Creek", the town was renamed "Summerfield" in 1845 to honor the noted Methodist preacher John Summerfield. In 1829, the first academy in Dallas County was chartered in Valley Creek. In 1842, the Alabama Conference of the Methodist Church opened the Methodist Centenary Institute, a coeducational institution chartered by the Alabama Legislature on January 2, 1841. At its peak when cotton production was profitable, Summerfield was a very prosperous community of planters, doctors, merchants, ministers, and educators. The historical core of Summerfield has survived intact and is listed on the National Register of Historic Places as a historic district encompassing .. On January 9, 2003, the people of Valley Grande voted 9 to 1 for incorporation as the Town of Valley Grande.  After the election of a mayor and five-member town council the vast majority of the Summerfield area was voluntarily annexed as part of Valley Grande.

Geography
Valley Grande is located in northeastern Dallas County at 32.486872, -87.032773. It is bordered to the south by the city of Selma, the county seat.

Demographics

As of the census of 2010, there were 4,020 people, 1,559 households, and 1,173 families residing in the city. The racial makeup of the city was 75.2% White, 23% Black or African American, 0.4% Native American, 0.4% Asian, 0.2% from other races, and 0.8% from two or more races.

There were 1,559 households, out of which 33.4% had children under the age of 18 living with them; 34.2% were married couples living together, 10.6% had a female householder with no husband present, and 24.8% were non-families. 21.7% of all households were made up of individuals, and 10.9% had someone living alone who was 65 years of age or older. The average household size was 2.58 and the average family size was 3.00.

The median income for a household in the city was $57,432, and the median income for a family was $64,461. Males had a median income of $42,456 versus $37,722 for females. The per capita income for the city was $25,767. About 8.7% of families and 8.8% of the population were below the poverty line, including 15.1% of those under age 18 and 6.4% of those age 65 or over.

2020 census

As of the 2020 United States census, there were 4190 people, 1292 households, and 971 families residing in the city.

Government
The city government is composed of a mayor and five at-large council members. The current mayor is Wayne Labbe. The city council members are Tim White, Ronald Sawyer, Lamar Morgan, Tammy Troha and Jimmy Johnson.

Education
Residents are zoned to schools in Dallas County Schools. Valley Grande Elementary School and Martin Middle School, within the city, serve the county. Most high school-aged students attend the public Dallas County High School, located in Plantersville, a nearby unincorporated area.

References

External links
City of Valley Grande official website

Cities in Alabama
Cities in Dallas County, Alabama
Populated places established in 2003
2003 establishments in Alabama